This is a week-by-week listing of the NCAA Division I teams ranked in the 2018 Top 25 coaches poll of the United Soccer Coaches (formerly the National Soccer Coaches Association of America NSCAA), the most widely recognized national collegiate soccer ranking system in the U.S. Several weeks prior to the season and each week during the playing season, the 206 Division I teams are voted on by a panel of 24 coaches from the division during a weekly conference call, with the rankings then announced early on Tuesday afternoon (Eastern Time). The poll has no bearing on the selections for the 2018 NCAA Division I Men's Soccer Championship, and the coaches association states: "The NSCAA College Rankings are an indicator of week-to-week status of qualified programs and in no way should be used as a guide or indicator of eligibility for championship selection."

Rankings
First place votes received in parentheses; rv = received votes. Source =

References 

NCAA
College soccer rankings in the United States